Yozuca* (b. March 21 in Kumamoto), stylised in all lowercase, is a Japanese female singer. She performs songs mainly for games and anime and is known especially for her vocal contributions to the Da Capo series. Her debut was in 2002 with the song "Da Capo: dai-2 botan no chikai", used as the theme song for the adult PC game D.C.: Da Capo. 
She works under Peak A Soul+, and most of her works are released by Lantis.

Yozuca* has often worked alongside Rino of CooRie, who also sings for the Da Capo series. They have performed together under the name yozurino*, and have been hosting the internet radio show Web Kissa yozurino* since 2004.

Discography

Singles 
 ダ・カーポ ～第2ボタンの誓い～ / Da Capo: dai-2 botan no chikai (Released August 22, 2002)
 ダ・カーポ ～第2ボタンの誓い～ / Da Capo: dai-2 botan no chikai — PC game D.C.: Da Capo opening theme
<li>ダ・カーポ ～第2ボタンの誓い～ / Da Capo: dai-2 botan no chikai off vocal

Sales: +20,000 copies

 サクラサクミライコイユメ / Sakura Saku Mirai Koi Yume (Released July 24, 2003)
 サクラサクミライコイユメ / Sakura Saku Mirai Koi Yume — anime television series D.C.: Da Capo opening theme
<li>サクラサクミライコイユメ / Sakura Saku Mirai Koi Yume (off vocal)

Sales: +100,000 (Gold)

 going my way (Released July 22, 2004)
 going my way — anime television series Girls Bravo first season opening theme
 月のヒカリ / Tsuki no Hikari
 going my way (off vocal)
 月のヒカリ / Tsuki no Hikari (off vocal)

Sales: +63,000 copies

 φなる・あぷろーち / Final Approach (Released October 6, 2004)
 φなる・あぷろーち / Final Approach — PS2 game Final Approach opening theme
<li>φなる・あぷろーち / Final Approach (off vocal)

Sales: +25,000+ copies

 Ever After (Released February 2, 2005)
 Ever After — anime television series Girls Bravo second season opening theme
 本当の笑顔 / Hontou no Egao
 Ever After (off vocal)
 本当の笑顔 / Hontou no Egao (off vocal)

Sales: +55,000 copies

 WHITE HEAT (Released February 16, 2005)
 WHITE HEAT — anime television series Ultimate Girls opening theme
<li>WHITE HEAT (カラオケ) / WHITE HEAT (karaoke)

Sales: +40,0000 copies

 サクライロノキセツ / Sakurairo no Kisetsu (Released July 21, 2005)
 サクライロノキセツ / Sakurairo no Kisetsu — anime television series D.C.S.S.: Da Capo Second Season opening theme
 チェーリング / Che-ring
 サクライロノキセツ / Sakurairo no Kisetsu (OFF VOCAL)
 チェーリング / Che-ring (OFF VOCAL)

Sales: +120,000 copies (Gold)

 サクライロノキセツ / Sakurairo no Kisetsu Re-Product and Remix and PV (Released September 29, 2005)
 サクライロノキセツ / Sakurairo no Kisetsu crunch world mix
 サクラサクミライコイユメ / Sakura Saku Mirai Koi Yume Virtual beautiful STAYKOOL club mix
 サクライロノキセツ / Sakurairo no Kisetsu night rainbow takes

Sales: +22,000 copies

 たったひとつだけ / Tatta Hitotsu Dake (Released February 8, 2006)
 たったひとつだけ / Tatta Hitotsu Dake — anime television series Tactical Roar opening theme
 ヒトリゴト / Hitorigoto
 たったひとつだけ / Tatta Hitotsu Dake (OFF VOCAL)
 ヒトリゴト / Hitorigoto (OFF VOCAL)

Sales: +35,000 copies

 キラメク / Kirameku (Released April 26, 2006)
 キラメク / Kirameku — anime television series Joshikousei GIRL'S-HIGH opening theme
 春の日 / Haru no Hi
 キラメク / Kirameku (Off vocal)
 春の日 / Haru no Hi (Off vocal)

Sales: 52,000+ copies

 君とあしたへ / Kimi to Ashita e (released April 26, 2006)
 君とあしたへ / Kimi to Ashita e — PC game True Tears ending theme
 君とあしたへ / Kimi to Ashita e: Traditional Euro Mix
 君とあしたへ / Kimi to Ashita e: LUVNOTE MIX
 君とあしたへ / Kimi to Ashita e *karaoke

Sales: +16,000 copies

 ダ・カーポII ～あさきゆめみし君と～ / Da Capo II: Asaki Yumemishi Kimi to (Released June 7, 2006)
 ダ・カーポII ～あさきゆめみし君と～ / Da Capo II: Asaki Yumemishi Kimi to — PC game D.C. II: Da Capo II opening theme
<li>ダ・カーポII ～あさきゆめみし君と～ / Da Capo II: Asaki Yumemishi Kimi to (Off Vocal)

Sales: +180,000 copies (Gold)

 Happy my life: Thank you for everything!! (Released May 9, 2007)
 Happy my life: Thank you for everything!! — PC game D.C.II Spring Celebration opening theme
 believe yourself — PC game D.C.II Spring Celebration insert song
 Happy my life: Thank you for everything!! (Off Vocal)
 believe yourself (Off Vocal)

Sales: +110,000 copies (Gold)

 サクラキミニエム / Sakura Kimi ni Emu (Released October 24, 2007)
 サクラキミニエム / Sakura Kimi ni Emu — anime television series D.C.II: Da Capo II opening theme
 Rainbow 07
 サクラキミニエム / Sakura Kimi ni Emu (off vocal)
 Rainbow 07 (off vocal)

Sales: +285,000 copies (Platinum)

 サクラ アマネク セカイ / Sakura amaneku sekai (Released April 23, 2008)
 サクラ アマネク セカイ / Sakura amaneku sekai — anime television series D.C.II: Da Capo II S.S. opening theme
 In the deep
 サクラ アマネク セカイ /Sakura amaneku sekai (off vocal)
 In the deep (off vocal)

Sales: +115,000+ copies (Gold)

 モーニング・シュガー・レイズ / Morning-sugar rays (Released August 27, 2008)
 モーニング・シュガー・レイズ /Morning-sugar rays
 One
 モーニング・シュガー・レイズ /Morning-sugar rays (off vocal)
 One (off vocal)

Sales: +39,000 copies

 エス・エス・ディー / S.S.D! (Released August 26, 2009)
 エス・エス・ディー  /S.S.D! Princess lover: ED theme
 No rule
 エス・エス・ディー  /S.S.D!(off vocal)
 No rule (off vocal)

Sales: +53,600 copies

 愛永久 〜Fortune favors the brave〜/めぐり愛逢い (Released January 27, 2010)
 愛永久 〜Fortune favors the brave〜/めぐり愛逢い
 愛永久 〜Fortune favors the brave〜/めぐり愛逢い(off vocal)

Sales: +34,000 copies

 ボクはきみのそばにいる! (Released February 23, 2011)
 ボクは君のそばにいる -PCゲーム、OVA『T.P.さくら 〜タイムパラディンさくら〜』エンディングテーマ-
 モラトリアム
 ボクは君のそばにいる(off vocal)
 モラトリアム (off vocal)

Sales: +19,000 copies

Albums 
 soleil*garden (Released September 1, 2004)
 ダ・カーポ ～第2ボタンの誓い～ / Da Capo: dai-2 botan no chikai
 Special Day ～太陽の神様～ / Special Day: taiyou no kamisama — PC game D.C. Sumer Vacation opening theme
 ひまわり / Himawari
 Fragment: The heat haze of summer / PC game Suika opening theme
 サクラサクミライコイユメ / Sakura Saku Mirai Koi Yume
 Fly together
 風が鳴いている / Kaze ga Naiteiru
 大事なもの / Daiji na Mono
 going my way ～primary version～
 花 / Hana
 きっと微笑むから / Kitto Hohoemu kara — PC game Doko e Iku no, Ano Hi insert song
 きずな / Kizuna

Sales: +150,000 copies (Gold)

 nico. (Released August 2, 2006)
 Only 1?
 神様強い勇気ください / Kamisama Tsuyoi Yuuki Kudasai
 Ever After
 冒険者 / Boukensha
 本当の笑顔 / Hontou no Egao
 チェーリング / Che-ring
 月のヒカリ / Tsuki no Hikari
 WHITE HEAT
 サクライロノキセツ / Sakurairo no Kisetsu
 たったひとつだけ / Tatta Hitotsu Dake
 ヒトリゴト / Hitorigoto
 コーヒー / Coffee

Sales: +125,000 copies (Gold)

 Ageha (Released January 23, 2008)
 Ageha
 Daybreak for me
 I.D.
 キラメク / Kirameku
 believe yourself
 shining☆star
 春の日 / Haru no Hi
 Blue flame
 sayonara jewel
 記憶の海 / Kioku no Umi — anime television series School Days ending theme
 Happy my life: Thank you for everything!!
 ダ・カーポII ～あさきゆめみし君と～ / Da Capo II: Asaki Yumemishi Kimi to

Sales: +250,000 (Platinum)

 stitch museum (Released May 12, 2010)
No ruLe
Do you love me?
愛永久 〜Fortune favors the brave〜
in the Deep
I will go
Graduation from yesterday
S.S.D!
Enjoy Life
Morning-sugar rays
レンブラントの光
雨上がりに咲いた虹
陽はまた昇る 〜stitch museum Ver〜
Rainbow 07
スタートライン [4:59]

Sales: +274,000 (Platinum)

 yozuca* 10th Anniversary Best (Released May 27, 2009)

Sales: +750,000 copies (3× Platinum)

 yozuca* 5th álbum - Asterisk music* (Released July 18, 2012)

Sales: +133,000 copies (Gold)

Other 
 Songs from D.C.: Da Capo (Released November 22, 2002)
 "Dakara Kiss no Sei ne" (だからキスのせいね) — PC game D.C.: Da Capo image song
 crystal: Circus Vocal Collection (released April 2, 2003)
 "All my love of the World" — PC game D.C. White Season ending theme
 "Dream: the other side" — PC game D.C.: Da Capo ending theme 2
 "Natsu no Owari ni..." (夏の終わりに…) DC game Suika image song (new arrange)
 "Sow" PC game InfantariaXP ending theme (new arrange)
 Anime television series Green Green Kikaku CD: Kanenone Jam02 (Released December 17, 2003)
 "Cherry" (チェリー) — Reika Morimura image song
 Onegai Twins Image Vocal Album: Esquisse (Released December 26, 2003)
 "RETRY" — Episode 10 image vocal
 TV animation D.C.: Da Capo Vocal Album: dolce (Released December 26, 2003)
 "Chime to you" — insert song
 "Takaramono" (宝物) — insert song
 "Honto no Kimochi" (ほんとのきもち) — insert song
 "Da Capo: dai-2 botan no chikai Twin Vocal Version" (ダ・カーポ ～第2ボタンの誓い～　ツインヴォーカルバージョン) — performed by yozuca* & rino
 "Sakura Saku Mirai Koi Yume Acoustic Version" (サクラサクミライコイユメ　アコースティックバージョン)
 D.C.P.S. Character Song Vol.1 (Released April 7, 2004)
 "Mirai Chizu" (未来地図) — PS2 game D.C.P.S.: Da Capo Plus Situation ending theme
 Tentama 2wins Vocal Plus (Released April 21, 2004):
 "Precious Time" — PS2 game Tentama 2wins opening theme
 "Ai no Hane" (愛の羽) PS2 game Tentama 2wins ending theme
 Saishuu Shiken Kujira: progressive memories (Released December 1, 2004)
 "Ushiro Sugata" (ウシロスガタ) — PC game Saishuu Shiken Kujira insert song
 crystal2: Circus Vocal Collection Vol.2 (Released January 13, 2005)
 "Akai Ito" (赤い糸) — PC game D.C. Summer Vacation ending theme
 Girls Bravo second season image vocal album: GO! GO! GIRLS! (Released March 24, 2005)
 "Trust me!" — Kirie's theme
 School Days Vocal Album (Released April 28, 2005)
 "BYE-BYE-TEARS" — PC game School Days ending theme of some Sekai endings
 Green Green 3: Hello Goodbye Original Soundtrack + Complete Album 2001-2005: 18 songs Memories (Released August 24, 2005)
 "Orgel" (オルゴール) — PC game Green Green 3: Hello Goodbye Chitose Kashiya ending theme
 TV animation D.C.S.S.: Da Capo Second Season Vocal Album: dolce2 (Released December 21, 2005)
 "Renai Sketch" (恋愛スケッチ) — insert song
 "Dear your mind" — insert song
 "Happy Basket" (ハッピーバスケット) — insert song
 Summer Days Original Sound Track (Released June 23, 2006)
 "Tanpopo no Wataboushi" (タンポポの綿帽子) — PC game Summer Days ending theme
 D.C.II: Da Capo II Vocal Album: Songs From D.C.II (Released July 26, 2006)
 "Mabushikute Mienai" (まぶしくてみえない) — PC game D.C.II: Da Capo II insert song
 Edelweiss Original Sound Track: FLOWERS (Released December 21, 2006)
 "Shukufuku no Uta" (祝福の歌) — PC game Edelweiss Natsume Amamiya ending theme
 Edelweiss Vocal album CD: Sunset・Sunrise (Released March 28, 2007)
 "Ai no Tane" (あいのたね) — Natsume Amamiya image theme
 Suika A.S+ Eternal Name Vocal album since Fragment (Released July 25, 2007)
 "Natsu ga Kureta Okurimono" (夏がくれた贈り物) — PS2 game Suika A.S+ Eternal Name shuumaku ending theme
 Anime television series School Days Ending Theme+ (Released August 22, 2007)
 "Kioku no Umi" (記憶の海) — anime television series School Days ending theme
 Anime television series Princess Lover Ending Theme+ (Released August 26, 2009)
 "S.S.D" — anime television series Princess Lover  ending theme
 Anime television series So, I Can't Play H! Ending Theme (Released August 8, 2012)
 "Platinum 17" So, I Can't Play H! Ending Theme

Notes and references 

 yozuca* listed at Lantis web site

External links 
 yozuca* official site
  yozuca* CDs (CDJapan)

Anime musicians
Japanese women singers
Lantis (company) artists
Living people
Musicians from Kumamoto Prefecture
Year of birth missing (living people)